Brinovščica (in older sources also Brinošica) is a small settlement in the hills north of Sodražica in southern Slovenia. It lies in the Municipality of Ribnica, part of the traditional region of Lower Carniola, and is now included in the Southeast Slovenia Statistical Region.

References

External links

Brinovščica on Geopedia

Populated places in the Municipality of Ribnica